Paris Awakens is a 1991 French drama film directed by Olivier Assayas. This film has been music composed by John Cale. The film starring Judith Godrèche, Jean-Pierre Léaud, Thomas Langmann, Antoine Basler, Jacques Martin Lamotte and Ounie Lecomte in the lead roles.

Cast
 Judith Godrèche
 Jean-Pierre Léaud
 Thomas Langmann
 Antoine Basler
 Jacques Martin Lamotte
 Ounie Lecomte
 Michèle Foucher
 Eric Daviron
 Edouard Montoute
 Samba Illa Ndiaye
 Eric De Roquefeuil

References

External links
 

1991 films
1990s French-language films
1991 drama films
French drama films
Italian drama films
Films directed by Olivier Assayas
1990s French films